The Juniper Tree is an opera co-composed by Philip Glass and Robert Moran in 1985 to a libretto by Arthur Yorinks based on the Brothers Grimm fairy tale.

The opera is in two acts and is scored for two baritones, bass, mezzo-soprano, four sopranos, tenor, mixed chorus, children's voices and chamber orchestra. Each composer wrote alternating scenes and utilized each other's themes to provide structural unity. Glass retained ownership of the opera, and did not allow for the "live" recording of the premiere (with Jayne West and Sanford Sylvan) to be released until 2009. Until then, Moran encouraged his fans to distribute bootleg copies so that people could hear it.

Performance history
It was premiered on December 11, 1985, at the American Repertory Theater in Cambridge, Massachusetts.

For its 25th anniversary of creation, the  presented the Canadian premiere of the opera in September, 2010, at the Salle Jean-Paul Tardif in Quebec, Canada.

Roles

Synopsis

The Grimm fairy tale tells of a wicked stepmother who murders her stepson, fearing that he reminds her husband of his late wife and serves him up in a stew to his hungry, unsuspecting father. The boy's sister buries her brother's bones under a juniper tree where their mother is buried, and the child's spirit returns as a singing bird who wreaks vengeance on the evil stepmother (dropping a millstone on her) before being restored to life in the bosom of his family.

References

Operas
Operas by multiple composers
Operas by Philip Glass
Compositions by Robert Moran
Minimalist operas
Cannibalism in fiction